In statistical learning theory, a learnable function class is a set of functions for which an algorithm can be devised to asymptotically minimize the expected risk, uniformly over all probability distributions. The concept of learnable classes are closely related to regularization in machine learning, and provides large sample justifications for certain learning algorithms.

Definition

Background 

The general goal in statistical learning is to find the function in  that minimizes the expected risk. That is, to find solutions to the following problem:

But in practice the distribution  is unknown, and any learning task can only be based on finite samples. Thus we seek instead to find an algorithm that asymptotically minimizes the empirical risk, i.e., to find a sequence of functions  that satisfies

One usual algorithm to find such a sequence is through empirical risk minimization.

Learnable function class 
We can make the condition given in the above equation stronger by requiring that the convergence is uniform for all probability distributions. That is:

The intuition behind the more strict requirement is as such: the rate at which sequence  converges to the minimizer of the expected risk can be very different for different . Because in real world the true distribution  is always unknown, we would want to select a sequence that performs well under all cases.

However, by the no free lunch theorem, such a sequence that satisfies does not exist if  is too complex. This means we need to be careful and not allow too "many" functions in  if we want to be a meaningful requirement. Specifically, function classes that ensure the existence of a sequence  that satisfies are known as learnable classes.

It is worth noting that at least for supervised classification and regression problems, if a function class is learnable, then the empirical risk minimization automatically satisfies.

Interpretations 
That is,

Here we let  be the collection of all possible functions mapping  onto .  can be interpreted as the actual data generating mechanism. This tradeoff can be mathematically expressed as

In the above decomposition, part  does not depend on the data and is non-stochastic. It describes how far away our assumptions are from the truth.  will be strictly greater than 0 if we make assumptions that are too strong ( too small). On the other hand, failing to put enough restrictions on  will cause it to be not learnable, and part  will not stochastically converge to 0. This is the well-known overfitting problem in statistics and machine learning literature.

Example: Tikhonov regularization 
A good example where learnable classes are used is the so-called Tikhonov regularization in reproducing kernel Hilbert space (RKHS). Specifically, let  be an RKHS, and  be the norm on  given by its inner product. It is shown in  that  is a learnable class for any finite, positive . The empirical minimization algorithm to the dual form of this problem is

This was first introduced by Tikhonov to solve ill-posed problems. Many statistical learning algorithms can be expressed in such a form (for example, the well-known ridge regression).

The way to choose an optimal  in finite sample settings is usually through cross-validation.

Relationship to empirical process theory 

In this field, the function class  that satisfies the stochastic convergence

are known as uniform Glivenko–Cantelli classes. It has been shown that under certain regularity conditions, learnable classes and uniformly Glivenko-Cantelli classes are equivalent.

However, note that in  the authors gave an example of stochastic convex optimization for General Setting of Learning where learnability is not equivalent with uniform convergence.

References 

Machine learning